The 1989–90 season was Cardiff City F.C.'s 63rd season in the Football League. They competed in the 24-team Division Three, then the third tier of English football, finishing twenty-first, suffering relegation to Division Four.

Manager Frank Burrows left the club in the first month of the year to become assistant manager at Portsmouth and was replaced by Len Ashurst, who started his second spell in charge of the club.

Players
First team squad.

Table

Results by round

Fixtures and results

Third Division

Source

League Cup

FA Cup

Welsh Cup

Leyland DAF Cup

See also
List of Cardiff City F.C. seasons

References

Bibliography

Welsh Football Data Archive

1989-90
1989–90 Football League Third Division by team
Welsh football clubs 1989–90 season